The Yesvantpur Ahmedabad Weekly Express is a passenger train that runs from Yesvantpur in Bangalore to Ahmedabad. The train traverses 1798 km.

Service
The average speed of the train is 52 km per hour. The train belongs to the South Western zone and is an AC mail and express train type.

From 2 May 2014, the train number has changed to 14805/14806, and a new station, Barmer, was added to the journey.

Coaches
The train doesn't have an AC 1st tier coach; it has the AC 2nd and AC 3rd tier coaches, sleeper coaches and unreserved coaches; it has second class coaches also.

References

Transport in Ahmedabad
Transport in Bangalore
Railway services introduced in 1989
Express trains in India
Rail transport in Karnataka
Rail transport in Gujarat
Rail transport in Maharashtra
Rail transport in Andhra Pradesh